The 34th Guangdong-Hong Kong Cup will be held on 28 December 2011 and 1 January 2012. The first leg will be played at Hong Kong Stadium with the second leg to take place at Huizhou Stadium.

Squads

Guangdong
Manager: Cao Yang

Hong Kong
Manager: Liu Chun Fai

Match details

First leg

Second leg

References

2011–12 in Hong Kong football
2012
2012 in Chinese football
December 2011 sports events in China
January 2012 sports events in China